Arlington High School (AHS), located in Arlington, Texas, is a secondary school serving grades 9-12. It is one of the six high schools comprising the Arlington Independent School District. The current principal is Stacie Humbles, the mascot is a Colt, and the school's colors are kelly green and white. 

At present, AHS has approximately 2700+ students. Most of the students previously attended Gunn, Bailey, and Carter Junior High Schools and are residents of Arlington, Dalworthington Gardens, and Pantego. Arlington High School has been accepted as an International Baccalaureate World School.

History

1903: The local schools were taken over by the city of Arlington from Carlisle Military Academy.
1904- 1922: High School, comprising grades 8 through 11, met at the South Side School which also housed 1st-7th grades. North Side School also had 1st through 7th.
1905: First graduating class of the High School made up of five girls.
1908: First graduating class with boys.
1922: Arlington High School built on Cooper St. and Abram St., separating grades 8 – 11 from first through seventh grades.
1923: Arlington High students chose Colts as the mascot and the colors of kelly green and white, replacing the former colors of black and crimson.
1942: A twelfth grade was added to the high school format for children beginning school that year. Students already in school simply skipped a grade.
1950: First live Little Arlie; “Sons of the White & Green” composed by Jane Ellis/Dean Corey.
1951: Arlington High defeats Waco La Vega for the Class AA State Championship title.
1956: Last class to graduate from AHS on Cooper St. and Abram St. AHS opens on Park Row Dr.
1957: First class to graduate from AHS on Park Row Dr.
1958: Former AHS reopens as Ousley Junior High, 8th grade only.
1963: Last class to graduate when Arlington High was the city’s only high school. Sam Houston High School opens in fall 1963.

Sam Houston, AISD's second high school, opened in the eastern part of Arlington in the Fall of 1963. The original boundary between Houston and Arlington High School was described by Cathy Brown of The Dallas Morning News as "a north/south zig zag." The boundary extended from a point near the intersection of Cooper at Mansfield northward to Arkansas Lane. From there, it extended east to Johnson Creek and then ran alongside the creek to Collins. After Collins the boundary traveled northward to the Arlington city limits.

In 1965 AISD desegregated, so Arlington High School desegregated.

1968: Ousley campus is sold to The University of Texas at Arlington; junior high relocated to Bailey Junior High on Bowen Rd.

In 1970, Lamar High School opened, relieving some of the overcrowding at Arlington and Sam Houston. Cathy Brown of The Dallas Morning News said that "[t]he effect on Arlington High School was huge" since the housing in the Arlington zone north to division had been moved to Lamar. 12th grade students that had been zoned out of Arlington High School continued to attend Arlington High School, despite being in the Lamar zone, so the class of 1971 had almost 1,000 students. Each subsequent class size was smaller.

1972: Principal James Crouch introduces slogan, “How Sweet It Is To Be In Colt Country.” at an outdoor pep rally.
1977: Logo with sideways horseshoe representing the “C” in Colts used for first time.

Martin High School opened in 1982. Because Martin, located in southwest Arlington, had opened, the attendance zone of Arlington High School lost many newly constructed houses for affluent people, as they had been rezoned to Martin. Brown also explained that "The Wimbledon area shifted west," The residents of Shady Valley area, still zoned to Arlington, were growing older, and the number of children was decreasing. The athletic teams at Arlington High School lost a lot of talent to Martin, due to the Martin rezoning.

1987: Colts lose to Odessa Permian in quarter finals begins the "Colt Stampede"
1988-89: Colts Junior Varsity and Varsity both go undefeated in regular season.
1992: Football makes the semi-finals for first time since 1950's
1997: Class of 2001 enters as freshmen; becomes first freshmen class in 40 years.
2008: Class of 2008 has first IB Students in Arlington (along with Bowie) to receive IB diploma
2008: Principal James Adams retires after serving AISD for 38 years.  Jennifer Young selected to serve as AHS Principal.

Feeder patterns
Duff, Hill, Swift, South Davis, and a portion of Dunn Elementaries feed into Bailey Jr. High. Bailey sends all of its students into AHS. Foster, Key, and Short Elementaries feed into Gunn Jr. High. Gunn sends the majority of its students to AHS and the rest goes to Bowie. Carter Junior High sends a small portion of its population to AHS.

Notable alumni

Neel E. Kearby '28 U.S. Army Air Corps Colonel and P-47 Thunderbolt pilot in World War II who received the Medal of Honor for his actions in combat.
Morgan Woodward '44 Film and TV actor. Best known for his recurring role in Dallas as Marvin "Punk" Anderson.
Rita Inos, '72, Educator and politician in the Northern Mariana Islands, first female candidate for Lieutenant Governor
 Ali Haji-Sheikh, '79, Collegiate and professional placekicker.  Member of 1984 NFC Pro Bowl team.
Gretchen Polhemus, '83, Miss USA 1989, 2nd runner up Miss Universe 1990
Darrell Lance Abbott, '85, also known as "Diamond Darrell", "Dimebag Darrell", "Dimebag" or simply "Dime", of Hard-Rock Band Pantera.
Amy N. Stewart, '87, author of From the Ground Up, Flower Confidential, Wicked Plants, and other books.
Hunter Pence, '01, Former Major League Baseball All-Star right fielder with the Houston Astros, San Francisco Giants and Texas Rangers.
V'Keon Lacey, American football player
Rogelio Funes Mori, '09, Professional Soccer Player for Mexican Club Monterrey
Tervel Dlagnev, Freestyle wrestler in the 2012 Summer Olympics
Luke Joeckel, '10, Professional NFL player for the Jacksonville Jaguars
Chris Martin, 2004, professional baseball player
Chris Harris, '66, Texas State Senator

References

External links
Arlington High Alumni
Arlington High School Homepage
Arlington Independent School District Homepage

Arlington Independent School District high schools
High schools in Arlington, Texas
International Baccalaureate schools in Texas
1904 establishments in Texas
Educational institutions established in 1904